Glockendon is a German surname. In particular, the Glockendons were a family of 15th-16th-century German artists from Nuremberg.

 Albrecht Glockendon the Elder (c.1432 — 1474)
 Georg Glockendon the Elder (d. 1514); son of Albrecht
 Albrecht Glockendon the Younger (d. 1545); son of Georg
 Nikolaus Glockendon (d. 1534); son of Georg
 Georg Glockendon the Younger (1492 — 1553); son of Nikolaus
 Gabriel Glockendon (active c. 1570 — 1595); son of Nikolaus

External links
 Dictionary of Painters and Engravers, by Michael Bryan, Robert Edmund Graves, Walter Armstrong (London: George Bell & Sons, 1889). Entries on the Glockendon family, however, are out of date.
 "Glockendon Family" on the Union List of Artist Names
 Smith, Jeffrey Chipps. "Glockendon." In Grove Art Online. Oxford Art Online, (accessed February 3, 2012; subscription required).
 
 
Surnames